Havadar Sport Club (Bashgah-e Vârzeshi-ye Havadar-e), commonly known as Havadar, is an Iranian football club based in Eslamshahr and capital Tehran, that competes in the Persian Gulf Pro League. The club was founded in 2018 as Sorkhpooshan Pakdasht Football Club.

The football team plays its home games at the Shohadaye Eslamshahr Stadium which has a seating capacity of 7,000. The club is also using the Ghadir Tehran Stadium which has a seating capacity of 2,500. The club is owned and supported by former professional football player Reza Enayati.

History 

The team entered the Azadegan League with the purchase of the team of South Tehran's independence team in the 2018–19 season with the coach of Farhad Kazemi. With the decision of the board, the name of the team changed before the start of the 2018–19 Azadegan League from Persepolis Pakdasht to the Sorkhpooshan Pakdasht.

The Sorkhpooshan Pakdasht club will be in the first league in the season of 2018–19, the first team was established under the name Persepolis Pakdasht.

While the Sorkhpooshan Pakdasht club was to be purchased from the Qashqai Club of Shiraz, the Ismael Sarhangian, owner of the Esteghlal E Jonoub of Tehran, announced the sale of a league's licence to the Sorkhpooshan Pakdasht.

Sorkhpooshan Pakdasht is anonymous and uninformed team that few people know about the terms of the club. Leading the Pakistani Paleolithic Club is Farhad Kazemi, the former president of the Tehran Rah Ahan and Pas Club.

The owner of the Sorkhpooshan Pakdasht Club is also Ghasem SamGhani. A person who is not familiar with sports. It's interesting to know that Sorkhpooshan Pakdasht entered the transfer market and attracted a few players. Players like Masoud Sattari, Shahin Balejani, Masoud Obaghou'i and Mostafa Nobakht, who show that they are active in the transfer market. Of course, they are looking for the striker Abbas Mohammad Rezaei the previous season and several other players.

Players 

For recent transfers, see List of Iranian football transfers summer 2022.

Managers

References

External links

Sorkhpooshan Pakdasht F.C. soccerway.com

Football clubs in Iran
Sport in Tehran Province
Havadar S.C.